Snooper's Charter may refer to:

 Investigatory Powers Act 2016, which comprehensively sets out and expands the electronic surveillance powers of the UK Intelligence Community
 Draft Communications Data Bill, a draft bill produced for consultation in 2012 but never introduced to Parliament